Sherbrooke was an electoral district of the Legislative Assembly of the Parliament of the Province of Canada, in Canada East.  It was centred primarily on the town of Sherbrooke in the Eastern Townships.

The district was created in 1841, based on the previous electoral district of the same name for the Legislative Assembly of Lower Canada, but with some significant alterations, to include the neighbouring town of Lennoxville.  The new boundaries were drawn by the Governor General of the Province of Canada, Lord Sydenham, to favour the anglophone voters, who would be likely to support the Governor General's government and the new Province of Canada, formed from the former provinces of Lower Canada and Upper Canada.  The boundaries of the electoral district were an example of an ethnic and linguistic gerrymander.

Sherbrooke electoral district was represented by one member in the Legislative Assembly.  It was abolished in 1867, upon the creation of Canada and the province of Quebec.

Boundaries 

Sherbrooke electoral district included the town of Sherbrooke, the village of Lennoxville, and the rural area connecting the two municipalities (with population growth, now merged into a single municipality of Sherbrooke).

The Union Act, 1840 merged the two provinces of Upper Canada and Lower Canada into the Province of Canada, with a single Parliament.  The separate parliaments of Lower Canada and Upper Canada were abolished.  The Union Act provided that the pre-existing electoral boundaries of Lower Canada and Upper Canada would continue to be used in the new Parliament, unless altered by the Union Act itself.

Sherbrooke was one of the electoral districts altered by the Union Act.  The Act provided that the town of Sherbrooke would be one electoral district, but gave the Governor General the power to draw the boundaries for the district.

The Governor General, Lord Sydenham, issued a proclamation on March 4, 1841, setting the boundaries for several electoral districts in Canada East, including Sherbrooke. The boundaries for Sherbrooke were as follows:

Sydenham's overall goal in drawing the boundaries was to ensure that supporters of the creation of the new Province of Canada would be elected. At that time, Sherbrooke and the village of Lennoxville were separate municipalities, three miles apart.  Both had substantial anglophone populations of British background, who were more likely to vote for the new union and for Sydenham's government, than were the francophone Canadiens, who generally opposed the union.  By linking Lennoxville to Sherbrooke, along with the corridor of largely rural land which connected them, Sydenham increased the likelihood that a member would be elected who supported the union and his government. The boundaries drawn by Sydenham were an example of an ethnic and linguistic gerrymander.

Members of the Legislative Assembly 

Sherbrooke was represented by one member in the Legislative Assembly. The following were the members for Sherbrooke.

Abolition 

The district was abolished on July 1, 1867, when the British North America Act, 1867 came into force, creating Canada and splitting the Province of Canada into Quebec and Ontario.  It was succeeded by electoral districts of the same name in the House of Commons of Canada and the Legislative Assembly of Quebec.

References 

Electoral districts of Canada East